The 1988 State of the Union Address was given by the 40th president of the United States, Ronald Reagan, on January 25, 1988, at 9:00 p.m. EST, in the chamber of the United States House of Representatives to the 100th United States Congress. It was Reagan's seventh and final State of the Union Address and his eighth and final speech to a joint session of the United States Congress. Presiding over this joint session was the House speaker, Jim Wright, accompanied by George H. W. Bush, the vice president.

Donald Hodel, the Secretary of the Interior, served as the designated survivor.

Summary
President Reagan began by announcing that his speech would not be a litany of achievements over the past seven years of his administration, but that he would continue to propose policy initiatives. He outlined the following objectives:
 Keep the economy strong and growing
 Review the state of social programs
 Continue spreading democracy around the world
 Maintain a strong defense
Reagan discussed the federal deficit, the size of the federal budget, abortion, crime, drugs, the line-item veto, foreign relations and the Soviet–Afghan War. He famously summarized the effect of government intervention on the poor: 

In closing he returned to his vision of America as a city on a hill: "We can be proud ... that another generation of Americans has protected and passed on lovingly this place called America, this shining city on a hill, this government of, by, and for the people."

The speech lasted approximately 44 minutes and consisted of 4,955 words. The address was broadcast live on radio and television.

Opposition response
The Democratic Party response was delivered by Senator Robert Byrd of West Virginia and Speaker of the House Jim Wright of Texas.

See also
Speeches and debates of Ronald Reagan
1988 United States presidential election

References

External links

 (full transcript), The American Presidency Project, UC Santa Barbara.
 1988 State of the Union Address (video) at C-SPAN
 1988 State of the Union Response (video) at C-SPAN
 Full video and audio, Miller Center of Public Affairs, University of Virginia.

State of the Union Address
State of the Union addresses
100th United States Congress
State of the Union Address
State of the Union Address
State of the Union Address
State of the Union Address
Articles containing video clips
January 1988 events in the United States